Nélson Alejandro Saavedra Sánchez (born 6 April 1988) is a Chilean professional footballer who plays as a defender for Dominican club San Cristóbal.

Club career
Born in Santiago, Saavedra began his professional career in the 2008 season with Palestino. Saavedra went on trial with Spanish giants Real Madrid in January 2009, but a move never materialised. Instead, he moved on loan to Brazil's Vitória for the 2009 season, but after failing to appear for his new club, he signed on loan for São Paulo. Saavedra never appeared for São Paulo either, and began the 2010 season on loan at a third Brazilian club, Atlético Goianiense.

On 12 December 2012, he is signed for Audax Italiano for the 2013 season.

In March 2021 he signed with Dominican club San Cristóbal.

References

1988 births
Living people
Chilean footballers
Association football defenders
Chilean Primera División players
Esporte Clube Vitória players
Atlético Clube Goianiense players
São Paulo FC players
O'Higgins F.C. footballers
Club Deportivo Palestino footballers
Audax Italiano footballers
Unión San Felipe footballers
Cobreloa footballers
Santiago Wanderers footballers
Chilean expatriate footballers
Expatriate footballers in Brazil
CA San Cristóbal players
Chilean expatriates in Brazil
Chilean expatriates in the Dominican Republic
Expatriate footballers in the Dominican Republic